William Wylie Grierson  (9 December 1863 – 14 March 1935) was a British civil engineer.

Grierson was born to James Grierson (Manager of the Great Western Railway) and Margaret Emily Grierson and was educated at Rugby School.  William married Aleen Isabel Bell on 14 September 1927 at St. Paul's Church, Knightsbridge.

Grierson followed in his father's footsteps as engineer in chief to the Great Western Railway between 1904 and 1923, following which he established an engineering consultancy firm. He was appointed a Commander of the Order of the British Empire in the 1918 New Year Honours for his efforts during the First World War.

He served as president of the Institution of Civil Engineers from 1929 to 1930. He also served in the Engineer and Railway Staff Corps, a Territorial Army unit whose members volunteer advice to the army on engineering matters.

He died suddenly in San Remo, Italy on 14 March 1935 after an operation.

See also 
 Clan Grierson

References 

        
        
        
        
        
        

British civil engineers
1863 births
1935 deaths
Presidents of the Institution of Civil Engineers
People educated at Rugby School
Engineer and Railway Staff Corps officers
Commanders of the Order of the British Empire